Southern literature is Southern United States literature. Southern literature can also refer to:

 Sangam literature, literature from Tamilakam, ancient southern India
 Occitan literature, from southern France, mostly in Occitan
 South African literature
 South Korean literature
 South Asian literature